Lotus Vingadassamy-Engel is a French Guadeloupean academic and expert on the Indian diaspora in South America. She has written on the effects of indentured labour and the Hindu customs practiced among their descendants.
She gave a lecture in the India International Centre in New Delhi on that subject. Her contribution was later published in the Monsoon issue of the IIC quarterly Vol 19 N° 3 (1992).

References

External links
Indian Diaspora: Where Bharat Mata Lives in Their Souls – INDOLink
Diaspora: Genealogies of Semantics and Transcultural Comparison – Numen, Vol. 47, No. 3, Religions in the Disenchanted World (2000), pp. 313–337
The Great Indian Diaspora – A Preface – INDOLink

French Indologists
French Guianan writers
Living people
Year of birth missing (living people)